Shao Xunmei (Shanghainese: Zau Sinmay; 1906–1968) was a Chinese poet and publisher. He was a contributing writer for T'ien Hsia Monthly, and also was the owner of Modern Sketch. He originated from Shanghai. Jonathan Hutt wrote in Monstre Sacré: The Decadent World of Sinmay Zau that "For many, Shao was not simply inspired by the Occident but rather was of it" and that his lack of awareness of "the Chinese literary scene" distinguished him from his colleagues. On some occasions he used the name Hao Wen.

Life
He was born Shao Yunlong in 1906 into a wealthy Shanghainese family with its ancestral hometown in Yuyao, Zhejiang. Shao lived in the wealthiest part of Shanghai, Bubbling Well Road. His grandfather  was a high-ranking official who served as governor of Taiwan and as a diplomat to Russia. His father Shao Heng married Sheng Xihui, a daughter of the tycoon Sheng Xuanhuai; Xunmei was the oldest of their six children.

Shao had been tailed by tabloids since his childhood and had various girlfriends, including the actress White Lotus (白蓮 Báilián) and a woman with the English name Prudence; Shao was briefly jailed after a man who was infatuated with Prudence was murdered, but Shao was found to have been not guilty and released.

Shao began a tour of Europe at age 17 in 1923 and continued it until 1927, going to Naples, Italy; Cambridge, England, and the École des Beaux Arts in Paris; he was educated in Cambridge and Paris. While in Europe he had relationships with women there. He finished a poetry collection towards the end of the trip and published it, titled Parade and May, in 1927. He became intrigued by the English writer Algernon Charles Swinburne and French writer Charles Baudelaire. The titles of works Fire and Flesh (火與肉 Huǒ yǔ ròu) and Flower-like Evil (花一般的罪惡 Huā yībān de zuì'è) were respectively inspired by a Swinburne poem and Les Fleurs du Mal by Baudelaire. The latter is an updated version of the earlier Paradise and May.

In December 1927 he married his cousin and childhood love Sheng Peiyu, a granddaughter of Sheng Xuanhuai. Hutt described Sheng as a "trophy wife". She was also known as "Zoa".

Twenty-five Poems (詩二十五首 Shīèr shíwǔ shǒu), Shao's collection of poetry that was published in 1936, did not garner significant attention. Hutt stated that Shao's popularity was declining by 1936.

In 1937 he began an affair with Emily "Mickey" Hahn; the affair ended after Hahn stopped smoking opium. When Hahn wrote articles for The New Yorker, she referred to Shao as "Pan Heh-ven," forming the basis of the 1942 book Mr. Pan. Hahn used Shao as the inspiration for Sun Yuin-loong, a character in Steps of the Sun. After the Japanese invasion Hahn was not interned since she had stated she was legally married to Shao Xunmei on a document, and therefore the Japanese treated her as, in the words of Taras Grescoe of The New Yorker, "an honorary Asian". Hahn stated that Shao's wife approved of the document since it was a possible method of saving his press and that Shao had not been married "according to foreign law". According to an article published in Ming Pao, a Hong Kong newspaper, during World War II, Shao had a habit of drinking alcohol and gambling, and therefore racked up a lot of expenses; Hahn covered the costs by selling her books. Hahn later wrote about Shao in her memoir, China to Me: A Partial Autobiography, using his actual name, spelled as "Sinmay Zau".

Shao had a son, Shao Zucheng, who attended schools operated by American missionaries and became an English teacher. He also had a daughter, Shao Xiaohong.

In 1958 Shao Xunmei wrote a letter to a friend in the United States, and as a result was imprisoned. He was released in three years, but his health had declined and did not improve afterwards. Shao Zucheng stated "When he came out of jail, he was so thin. He looked just like a monkey."

Hahn learned that Shao eventually stopped using opium. After Shao died, Hahn was unaware that he was dead. He was buried in Gui Yan Cemetery.

Legacy
Hutt stated that Shao continued to be perceived as "a caricature" by the 1990s even though his image had been somewhat rehabilitated in that decade.

Jicheng Sun and Hal Swindall, authors of "A Chinese Swinburne: Shao Xunmei's Life and Art," wrote circa 2015 that few people were aware of him "except for a handful of scholars of modern Chinese literature"; they stated that there were not many scholarly articles about Shao, and that reference books published in China "give him a few lines as a minor poet with decadent tendencies".

Selected works
 Flower-like Evil (花一般的罪惡 Huā yībān de zuì'è). Jinwu shudian (Shanghai), 1918.
 Paradise and May (poetry collection), 1927.
 Tiantang yu wuyue (天堂與五月). Guanghua shuju (Shanghai), 1927.
 Fire and Flesh (火與肉 Huǒ yǔ ròu). Jinwu shudian (Shanghai), 1928.
 "Jinwu Tanhua" (金屋談話; Talk at Maison d'or). Jinwu Yuekan (金屋月刊; La Maison d'Or Monthly), January 1929, Volume 1, Issue 1, p. 157.
 Translated into English by Reverend Moule and Paul Pelliot, within Marco Polo: The Description of the World (Routledge and Sons, London, 1938).
 As Hao, Wen: Review of The Escaped Cock by D.H. Lawrence. In: "Shubao Chunqiu" (書報春秋; Books and Newspapers Annals), Xinyue, 1932, 1–4.
 Yigeren de tanhua (一個人的談話; A One-Way Conversation). Diyi Chubanshe (Shanghai), 1935.
 Twenty-five Poems (詩二十五首 Shīèr shíwǔ shǒu), 1936.

References
 Sun, Jicheng and Hal Swindall. "A Chinese Swinburne: Shao Xunmei's Life and Art." In: Marino, Elisabetta and Tanfer Emin Tunc. The West in Asia and Asia in the West: Essays on Transnational Interactions. McFarland, January 16, 2015. ISBN . Start p. 133.

Notes

Further reading
English:
 Hahn, Emily. Mr. Pan. Doubleday (Garden City, New York), 1942.
 Hutt, Jonathan. "La Maison d'Or: The Sumptuous world of Shao Xunmei." East Asian History 21, June 2001. pp 111–142.
 Ho Yeon Sung. "A Comparative Study of Shao Xunmei's Poetry." Ohio State University, 2003. - of Prof. Kirk Denton
 a novel based on a fictional sister of Shao, Weina Di Randell, The Last Rose of Shangai, 2021 - https://books.google.cl/books/about/The_Last_Rose_of_Shanghai.html?id=wcVizgEACAAJ&redir_esc=y

Chinese:
 Li Guangde. "Shao Xunmei de shi yu shilun" (The poetry and poetic critiques of Shao Xunmei). Huzhou Shizhuan Xuebao, 1985.22.
 Sheng, Peiyu. "Yi Shao Xunmei" (Remembering Shao Xunmei). Wenjiao Ziliao (Materials on Literary Education), Nanjing Normal College, 1982. No. 5, p. 47-72.
 Sheng, Peiyu. "Wo he Shao Xunmei" (Shao Xunmei and I). Huzhou Shizhuan Xuebao (Academic Journal of the Huzhoa Normal College), 1984. No. 5, p. 47-72.
 Su, Xuelin. "Tuijiadang pai de Shao Xunmei" (颓加荡派的邵洵美 "The Decadent School's Shao Xunmei). Er-sanshi niandai zuojia yu zuopin (二三十年代作家與作品; Authors and Works of the Twenties and Thirties). Guangdong chunbanshe (Taipei), 1980. p. 148-155.
 Wen, Xing (文星). "Tuifeishiren Shao Xunmei" (頹廢詩人邵洵美). Ming Pao (Hong Kong). April 5, 1974.
 Zhang, Kebiao. "Haishang Caizi Gao Chuban-Ji Shao Xunmei" (A Shanghai Talent Getting Involved in Publishing-Remembering Shao Xunmei). Shanghai Wenshi (Shanghai Literature and History), 1989. No. 2, p. 4-10.
 "邵洵美 一个被严重低估的文化人." . 2012-12-21.

1906 births
1968 deaths
20th-century Chinese poets
Businesspeople from Shanghai
Chinese publishers (people)
Poets from Shanghai
Victims of the Cultural Revolution
Writers from Shanghai